The 2019 Swedish Men's Curling Championship was held in Jönköping from January 2 to 6, 2019.

Both 2019 Swedish Women's Curling Championship and 2019 Swedish Wheelchair Curling Championship were held simultaneously with this championship at the same arena.

Teams

Triple knockout stage

A Event (A-stege)
Two winners - directly to medal stage, losers - to В Event.

B Event (B-stege)
Three winners - directly to medal stage, losers - to C Event.

C Event (C-stege)
Three winners - directly to medal stage, losers - out.

Medal stage (Slutspel)

Step 1

Step 2

Step 3

Semifinals. January 6, 9:00 am

Final. January 6, 2:00 pm

Final standings

References

See also
2019 Swedish Women's Curling Championship

2019
Swedish Men's Curling Championship
Curling Men's Championship
Swedish Men's Curling Championship
Sports competitions in Jönköping